Leinenosi  is a mountain in the municipality of Hemsedal in Buskerud, Norway.

External links
Map of Leinenosi
 

Hemsedal
Mountains of Viken